The Süllberg is with a height of up to  the third largest hill in Blankenese, Hamburg, Germany. It is part of the high shore of Blankenese. It has a rich history. In 1060/61 there was built a castle on its top by Adalbert of Hamburg. To date at the place of the former castle there is a hotel and restaurant of the well known chef Karlheinz Hauser, Hotel Süllberg. The top of the hill is owned by investor Peter Möhrle.

References

Altona, Hamburg
Hills of Hamburg